Neo-Mudéjar is a type of Moorish Revival architecture practised in the Iberian Peninsula and to a far lesser extent in Ibero-America. This architectural movement emerged as a revival of Mudéjar style. It was an architectural trend of the late 19th and early 20th centuries that began in Madrid and Barcelona and quickly spread to other regions in Spain and Portugal. It used Mudéjar style elements such as the horseshoe arch, arabesque tiling, and abstract shaped brick ornamentations for the façades of modern buildings.

History

The first examples of Neo-Mudéjar buildings were the Aguirre School designed by Rodríguez Ayuso, the Plaza de Toros in Madrid built in 1874 (now demolished), and the Casa Vicens by Antoni Gaudí i Cornet. The style then became almost "compulsory" for the construction of bullfight rings all around Spain, Portugal and the Hispanoamerican countries. In Madrid it became one of its most representative styles of the period, not only for public buildings, like the Aguirre School or the bullring of Las Ventas, but also for housing. The use of cheap materials, mainly brick for exteriors, made it a popular style in new neighborhoods.

Neo-Mudéjar was often combined with Neo-Gothic by architects such as Francisco de Cubas, Antonio María Repullés y Vargas and Francisco Jareño. After the Ibero-American Exposition of 1929 in Seville, another stream of Neo-Mudéjar features appeared known as Andalusian Architectural Regionalism. The Plaza de España (Seville) or the ABC newspaper headquarters (Madrid) are examples of this new style that combined traditional Andalusian architecture with Mudéjar features.

List of notable Neo-Mudéjar buildings

Arenas de Barcelona
Gran Teatro Falla, Cádiz
Las Ventas bullring, Madrid
Casa Vicens, Barcelona
Monserrate Palace, Sintra
Church of Santa Cruz, Madrid
Palacete Conceição e Silva, Lisbon
Church of La Paloma, Madrid
Quinta do Relógio, Sintra
Water tower (now exhibition space) Torre de Canal Isabel II, in Madrid.
Escuelas Aguirre, Madrid
Pena Palace, Sintra
Toledo railway station
Nazaré Bullring, Nazaré
Zaragoza Post-Office
Campo Pequeno bullring, Lisbon
Morisco Kiosk, Mexico City
 Palacio de Orleans-Borbón

Gallery

See also

 Moorish Revival architecture
 Spanish architecture
 Indo-Saracenic architecture

References

External links
Cunill, Inmaculada Rodríguez. ARQUITECTURA DEL SIGLO XIX. .

.
 
Revival architectural styles
Architectural styles
House styles

 
Architecture in Spain
Architecture in Portugal